The European Review is a peer-reviewed academic journal covering contemporary issues in Europe. It covers a broad range of fields, including the humanities, social sciences, exact sciences, applied sciences, and life sciences.

The journal is sponsored by the Academia Europaea and published by Cambridge University Press. It was initially published by John Wiley & Sons.

Abstracting and indexing 
The journal is abstracted and indexed in the British Humanities Index, Scopus, EBSCOhost, and Applied Social Sciences Index and Abstracts.

External links 
 

Economics journals
English-language journals
European history journals
Publications established in 1993
Quarterly journals
Cambridge University Press academic journals
Academic journals associated with international learned and professional societies of Europe
Historiography of Europe